Champion of the Seas was the second largest clipper ship destined for the Liverpool, England - Melbourne, Australia passenger service. Champion was ordered by James Baines of the Black Ball Line from Donald McKay. She was launched 19 April 1854 and was abandoned 3 January 1877, off Cape Horn.

Champion of the Seas set a record for the fastest day's run in 24 hours:  noon to noon 10–11 December 1854 under the command of Captain Alexander Newlands (which translates into 19.5 knots). This record stood until August 1984, nearly 130 years.

Construction
Champion of the Seas was "fuller aft than forward", and her strength of construction was an improvement over the Lightning, which Mackay had built the previous year. The frame was white oak, diagonally cross-braced with iron, planking and ceiling of hard pine, square fastened throughout. She had 3 decks. Her sail area and spars were roughly the same as Lightning. Her working suit of sails required 12,500 yards of cotton, 18 inches wide.

Upon completion, Champion of the Seas was towed from Boston to New York by the steam tug R.B. Forbes.

Champion of the Seas'''s figurehead was the full figure of a sailor "with his hat in his right hand, and left hand extended ... It was certainly a most striking figurehead, the tall square-built mariner, with dark curly hair and bronze clean-shaven face." Her semi-elliptical stern was ornamented with the coat of arms of Australia. She was painted black on the outside, white on the inside, with blue waterways: the colors of the Black Ball Line.

 History 
James Baines ordered Champion of the Seas from Donald McKay of East Boston for the Black Ball Line of Liverpool. She was similar in appearance to McKay's other clippers, Lightning and James Baines, but set no sails above the royals. She set the record for the longest day's run,  on 10–11 December 1854 on her maiden voyage from Liverpool to Melbourne.

From her launching to 1868, Champion served in the passenger trade. During the Indian Mutiny of 1857, the British government chartered the three Black Ball clippers to carry troops to Calcutta. Before embarking about 1,000 troops, she and James Baines were reviewed by Queen Victoria. In 1868 she entered the general shipping trade. She remained in this trade until 3 January 1877 when she was abandoned, leaking badly, with a load of guano off Cape Horn.

 In popular culture 
Pan American World Airways (Pan Am) had a practice of naming its airliners "Clippers", as an allusion to the clipper ships of earlier times. Between 1984 and 1991, a Pan Am Boeing 747-121 airliner (MSN 19641 / tail number N734PA) was named Clipper Champion of the Seas in accordance with this practice.  The airliner, which had been delivered to Pan Am in 1969, had previously been named Clipper Flying Cloud''.

See also
List of clipper ships
Bibliography of early American naval history

References

Notes

Bibliography

External links 

 "The Champion of the Seas Times" Weekly newspaper produced on board ship
 Ships of the World: Champion of the Seas
 Sailing Ships: Champion of the Seas
 The Boston Daily Atlas, Vol. XXII, No. 274, Saturday, 20 May 1854 Description of construction, spars, rigging, etc.
 First voyage of the Champion of the Seas
 Steve Fossett Challenges

Individual sailing vessels
Age of Sail merchant ships of the United States
Ships built in Boston
Ships designed by Donald McKay
Troop ships of the United Kingdom
Victorian-era passenger ships of the United Kingdom
History of immigration to Australia
Victorian-era merchant ships of the United Kingdom
Guano trade
Shipwrecks in the Southern Ocean
Maritime incidents in January 1877
Maritime incidents in Chile
1854 ships
1877 in Antarctica
1877 in Chile